Kenneth Kerewi (born 8 May 1982) is a Nigerian footballer who plays as a midfielder for Vaipuna. Besides Nigeria, he has played in Bhutan, Samoa, and American Samoa.

Career

Before the 2016 season, Kerewi signed for Samoan side Kiwi FC. Before the 2017 season, he signed for Utulei Youth in American Samoa. Before the 2018 season, he signed for Samoan top flight club Lupe o le Soaga. Before the 2021 season, he signed for Vaipuna in Samoa.

References

External links

 Kenneth Kerewi at playmakerstats.com
 

1982 births
Association football midfielders
Expatriate footballers in American Samoa
Expatriate footballers in Bhutan
Expatriate footballers in Samoa
Kiwi FC players
Living people
Nigerian expatriate footballers
Nigerian footballers